Hoot N Holler is a steel family roller coaster at Six Flags Darien Lake in New York. It is manufactured by Zierer.

History
When constructed in 1981, it was the first roller coaster at the park. The coaster was originally called Ladybug for its ladybug shaped trains. The coaster was located in the vicinity of the Giant Wheel from 1981 to 1988. It was later moved to Adventure Land for Kids (created in 1988) where it was renamed Nessie the Dreamy Dragon to fit with the dragon theming of that area. Then, it was moved near Mind Eraser in an area called Tiny Trio which featured two other rides called BMX Motocross (relocated to Elitch Gardens as Trike Bikes) and Dodgems (now known as Raccoon Rally).

The ride cars were green with yellow seats (prior to that the cars were red) and the track was black until it was moved to its new location and renamed in 1997. The ride from 1997 to 2011 had a red track with teal supports and a single light blue train with red seats. This color scheme is similar to the nearby Mind Eraser, an inverted roller coaster built by Vekoma in 1997. The ride now has a sea green track and supports, and a single brown train themed as an owl.

For the 2012 season, Darien Lake rethemed their kid's section to Rowdy's Ridge which included several new rides (Hornet's Nest, Moose on the Loose, and Rowdy's Heave Ho) and changes to two rides (Brain Teaser became Hoot N Holler and Dodgems became Raccoon Rally).

Current operation
Hoot N Holler is intended for children between 36 and 54 inches tall. The coaster is operated with one five-car train with one row per car. Riders are seated two per row for a total of ten riders per train. When the ride is used at full capacity it can take 600 riders per hour.
The ride's train has an owl theme.

See also
 2012 in amusement parks

References

Junior roller coasters
Six Flags Darien Lake
Roller coasters in New York (state)
Roller coasters introduced in 1981
Roller coasters operated by Herschend Family Entertainment